Oleg Gennadyevich Malyukov (born October 30, 1965) is a Russian professional football coach and a former player. He played 8 games for PFC CSKA Moscow in the UEFA Champions League 1992–93. His son Oleg Olegovich Malyukov is also a professional footballer.

Honours
 Soviet Top League champion: 1991.
 Soviet Top League runner-up: 1990.
 Soviet Cup winner: 1991.
 Soviet Cup finalist: 1992.
 Russian Cup finalist: 1993, 1994.
 Belarusian Premier League runner-up: 1999.

External links
  Career profile at footballfacts

1965 births
Living people
Sportspeople from Dushanbe
Soviet footballers
Tajikistani footballers
Russian footballers
Association football defenders
CSKA Pamir Dushanbe players
PFC CSKA Moscow players
Hapoel Rishon LeZion F.C. players
FC Slavia Mozyr players
Soviet Top League players
Liga Leumit players
Russian Premier League players
Russian expatriate footballers
Expatriate footballers in Israel
Expatriate footballers in Belarus
Russian expatriate sportspeople in Israel
Russian expatriate sportspeople in Belarus
Russian football managers
FC Torpedo Vladimir players